Pierre Antoine Favre (20 February 1813 – 17 February 1880) was a French physician and chemist who specialized in conducting experiments in thermochemistry. In his work from 1852 along with Johann T. Silberman on heat produced by chemical reactions, he popularized the use of the unit "calorie".

Biography 
Favre was born in Lyons on February 20, 1813. He received a medical degree from Paris University in 1835. He shifted to study chemistry after being inspired by Jean Dumas' lectures and joined Eugene Peligot to study uranium salts. He was one of the two chemists who successfully demonstrated that the heats of the acid and bases were the sum of two constant terms, one dependent on the acid while the other on the bases. 

Favre then studied physiological chemistry under Louis Jecker, examining the composition of human sweat, forty litres of which he collected. One of his most important works was his investigation on the physiological chemistry of individuals who suffered from scorbutic complaints.

Favre took up a teaching position in chemistry. In 1843 he identified the atomic weight of zinc. His major contribution from 1844 to 1849 was in the measurement of heat evolved in chemical reactions. It has been claimed that he coined the term "calorie" although he only adopted the unit and made it more popular among French chemists. He is noted for his calometric studies of heat reactions, such as his examination of the heat of the reaction of gunpowder explosion. He joined the science faculty at Marseille in 1856 becoming dean in 1872 but retired in 1878 due to poor health.

References 

1813 births
1880 deaths
19th-century French chemists
Scientists from Lyon